Heliopsis parvifolia is a North American species of flowering plant in the family Asteraceae, known by the common name mountain oxeye.

Range and Habitat
Heliopsis parvifolia is native to northern Mexico from Baja California east to Tamaulipas and south as far as Aguascalientes, as well as the southwestern United States (southern Arizona, southern New Mexico, western Texas). It grows on open rocky mountain slopes and canyons at elevations between 1200 and 2500 meters.

Description
The plant generally produces 1-5 flower heads per stem. Each head contains 6-19 bright yellow ray florets surrounding 40 or more yellowish-brown disc florets.

References

External links
Photo of herbarium specimen collected in Nuevo León in 1989

parvifolia
Flora of Mexico
Flora of the Southwestern United States
Plants described in 1853